Cociella somaliensis is a species of demersal, marine ray-finned fish belonging to the family Platycephalidae, the flatheads. It is found in the north western Indian Ocean.

Taxonomy
Cociella somaliensis was first formally described in 1996 by Leslie William Knapp with the type locality given as south of Ras Hafun in Somalia. These fishes were previously regarded as a population of the crocodile flathead (C. crocodilus) but were recognised as a valid species in 1996, although this species was only tentatively assigned to the genus Cociella. The specific name somaliensis refers to the type locality.

Description
Cociella somaliensis has 8 spines in the first dorsal fin with an additional very small separate spine to the front of it while the second dorsal fin has 12 soft rays, while the anal fin may have between 11 and 13 soft rays but typically has 12. The pectoral fins have 19-22 rays. In the lateral line the pored scales at the front end have spines. The upper body is pale tan in colour, marked with a scattering of small dark spots. The first dorsal fin is dusky marked with large dark spots while the second is also marked with large dark spots but on a pale background. The paired fins are dusky while the caudal fin is marked with spots and bars.

Distribution and habitat

References

somaliensis
Fish described in 1996